Beyond the Rainbow is a 1922 American silent drama film starring Billie Dove, Harry T. Morey and Clara Bow in her film debut. A 16mm print of the film is in the collection of the UCLA Film and Television Archive.

Plot
As described in a film magazine, Marion Taylor (Dove) is a stenographer employed by Wall Street broker Edward Mallory (Morey). She is the support of an invalid younger brother, who has been ordered to the Adirondack Mountains by the family physician. To get money for this, she attends a reception as the escort of a young society man, for which she receives $100. Edward is peeved as she has rejected his advances, and threatens to expose her when he sees Marion at the party. Each guest at the function receives a mysterious note saying, "Consult your conscience. Your secret is common gossip." Immediately, the guests are thrown into a panic as each has something to hide. The notes, however, were inspired by flapper Virginia Gardener, who had been left out of the party thrown by her mother (Ware), and passed out the notes as a joke to get revenge. A man is shot during the excitement and Major Bruce Forbes (Gordon), who picked up the gun, is initially accused of murder. However, the real shooter soon confesses. Marion goes to the Adirondacks to see her brother, and finds happiness in the arms of Bruce, who fell in love with her at the ball.

Cast

Production notes
Clara Bow made her film debut in Beyond the Rainbow after winning a beauty and acting magazine sponsored contest. She filmed five scenes but, after seeing the film in Brooklyn, thought that she was cut from the film. Bow was devastated and put temporarily her acting ambitions aside; however, newspaper advertisements and editorial comments suggests she was not cut at all, at least not from the main release.

References

External links

 
 

1922 films
1922 drama films
Silent American drama films
American silent feature films
American black-and-white films
Films directed by Christy Cabanne
Films based on short fiction
Films shot in New York City
American independent films
Film Booking Offices of America films
1920s independent films
1920s American films
1920s English-language films